Lake Miyagase (宮ヶ瀬湖) is a lake within the Aiko District of Kanagawa, Japan, located between Sagamihara and Atsugi. The lake offers views of Tanzawa Mountains, including Mount Hiru. The lake is a man-made reservoir and formed by the Miyagase Dam, and is a source of drinking water for Yokohama and Tokyo.

External links

Miyagase
Landforms of Kanagawa Prefecture
Sagamihara
Atsugi, Kanagawa